Egypt–Japan relations are foreign relations between Egypt and Japan. Such relations are described by the Egyptian ambassador to Japan as a "very strong friendship", with embassies mutually established. At present, the two nations maintain a cordial relationship with strong economic and trade relations.

History

Relations between two countries are traceable as far back as the nineteenth century. However, modern relations were established in 1922, when Japan recognised Egypt's independence. On February 26, 1945 the Egyptian government declared war on the Japanese Empire as part of the Allied war effort. The Egyptian government was signatory to the Peace Treaty of San Francisco in 1951, and diplomatic relations were reestablished in 1952. Since then, there has been a history of a cordial relationship, with several visits by senior diplomats and, most notably, visits by respective heads of state — in 1995, Japanese Prime Minister Tomiichi Murayama visited Egypt and former President Mubarak of Egypt has visited Japan on several occasions 1983, 1995, and 1999. This habit of visitation is maintained up to present day, with the current president Abdel Fattah el-Sisi having visited Japan three times between the years of 2016 and 2020.

Between 1998 and 2002, Japan loaned, granted and provided more than $3.5 billion to Egypt. In 2002, bilateral trade between Egypt and Japan exceeded $1 billion; giving ambulances, a bridge and the visitor centre at the Valley of the Kings.

As of October 2009, 1051 Japanese citizens reside in Egypt. 90,000 Japanese visited Egypt in 2009 and 3,500 Egyptians visited Japan in 2007.

Diplomacy
Japan considers Egypt a key player in the Middle East and, as such, sees Egypt as a vital part of its diplomacy in the region. The two heads of government have been known to support each other on issues pertaining to the peace process in the Middle East.

The two countries maintain a "Joint Committee" dedicated to exploring developments in areas of mutual interest to the two countries.

References

External links
 Embassy of Egypt in Japan
 Embassy of Japan in Egypt